Willi Sitte (28 February 1921 – 8 June 2013) was a German painter who was for a long time the president of the East German association of visual artists.

References

 Wolfgang Hütt: Willi Sitte. Verlag der Kunst, Dresden 1976.
Robert R. Shane: Personal and Political. The Dynamics of East German Art in the Painting of Willi Sitte. In: Art criticism. No. 2, 2004, .
Joachim Jahns (ed.): Herr Mittelmaß 1949–1995. Dingsda, Querfurt 1995, .
Horst Kolodziej (ed.): Das Sitte-Verbot. Katalog (k)einer Ausstellung; zum 80. Geburtstag Willi Sittes: Texte, Bilder, Dokumente. GNN, Schkeuditz 2001.
Gisela Schirmer: Willi Sitte, Farben und Folgen. Faber & Faber, Leipzig 2003, .
G. U. Grossmann (ed.): Politik und Kunst in der DDR: Der Fonds Willi Sitte im Germanischen Nationalmuseum. 
Axel Dielmann: "Junge mit Märchenbuch". Novella on correspondent gouache (1950) by Willi Sitte, in: "Nizza oder Die Liebe zur Kunst". Vantage Point World-Verlag, Bad König 2013 (Germany), .

External links

Entry for Willi Sitte on the Union List of Artist Names

1921 births
2013 deaths
People from Chrastava
Sudeten German people
Members of the Central Committee of the Socialist Unity Party of Germany
Members of the 7th Volkskammer
Members of the 8th Volkskammer
Members of the 9th Volkskammer
Cultural Association of the GDR members
East German artists
German male painters
20th-century German painters
20th-century German male artists
21st-century German painters
21st-century German male artists
Naturalized citizens of Germany
German military personnel of World War II
Italian resistance movement members
Recipients of the National Prize of East Germany